Emma Lake is a recreational lake in the Canadian province of Saskatchewan. The lake is within the District of Lakeland No. 521 and east of Prince Albert National Park. There are several small communities and recreational opportunities around Emma Lake and much of the northern half is within Great Blue Heron Provincial Park. Access to the lakes is from Highways 953, 952, and 263.

Description 
Emma Lake is in the Spruce River drainage basin. The Spruce River is a tributary of the North Saskatchewan River. The lake consists of three main sections that are connected by narrow straits. The northern section is mostly within Great Blue Heron Provincial Park and includes Fairy Island and the small community of Okema Beach. Cattle Island separates the northern section from the central one and Murray Point and McPhail Cove are found there. The strait at McIntosh Point separates the central section from the southern one. The southern section consists of Munsons and Sunset Bays and numerous communities, including Neis Beach, Emma Lake, Guise Beach, and Sunnyside Beach. Montreal Creek is the primary natural inflow while Emma Lake diversion from Anglin Lake is the greatest by volume inflow. Prior to the completion of the diversion, neither Emma nor neighbouring Christopher Lake were connected to the Spruce River.

Emma Lake diversion 
Anglin, Emma, and Christopher Lakes historically have experienced extreme variations in seasonal water levels. To help alleviate this, with the construction of Spruce River Dam in 1960, the Emma Lake diversion was constructed from Anglin Lake to Emma Lake. The 10-kilometre diversion channel begins at a pumphouse about one kilometre north-east of Spruce River Dam on Anglin Lake. From there, the water uses gravity to travel through ditches, natural channels, and Blanche and Mae Lakes en route to the northern end of Emma Lake.

The Emma Lake diversion project also included the construction of the Christopher Lake diversion. The first part of the Christopher Lake diversion is a short channel connects Emma Lake near Neis Beach to Christopher Lake at Clearsand Beach. The diversion opened in 1965 and, a few years later, water levels in Christopher Lake rose 2.2 metres from 1960 levels. Controlling the outflow from Emma Lake is a  grated culvert control structure through Highway 953. At the southern end of Christopher Lake is the second part of the Christopher Lake diversion project. It the was the final phase of the diversion project and it involved constructing the lake's outflow at Christopher Creek. Christopher Creek is a partially natural run and partially constructed channel that flows south from Christopher Lake near the village of Christopher Lake to the Spruce River south of the Little Red River Indian Reserve. Water flowing into Christopher Creek is controlled by a two-bay log-stop structure which controls flow into two  culverts. The structure allows drawdown of both Emma and Christopher Lakes simultaneously. This final phase of the project wasn't completed until 1975.

Fish species 
Fish commonly found in the lake include walleye, northern pike, white sucker, and yellow perch.

See also 
List of lakes of Saskatchewan
Saskatchewan Water Security Agency
Emma Lake Artist's Workshops

References

External links 
Emma Lake Recreation Site

Lakeland No. 521, Saskatchewan
Lakes of Saskatchewan
Division No. 15, Saskatchewan